Gemma Natasha Frizelle (born 2 May 1998) is a British rhythmic gymnast, who won the individual hoop event at the 2022 Commonwealth Games. She has won multiple medals at the Welsh and British Rhythmic Gymnastics Championships, and also competed at the 2018 Commonwealth Games.

Career
Frizelle took up rhythmic gymnastics at the age of 12. She trains at Llanelli Rhythmic Gymnastics Academy. She finished second at the 2015 Welsh Rhythmic Gymnastics Championships, as well as the all-around events at the 2016 and 2017 British Rhythmic Gymnastics Championships.

Frizelle competed at the 2018 Commonwealth Games. She finished 15th in the individual all-around competition, and was part of the Welsh team that finished fifth in the team all-around event. At the 2018 Welsh Rhythmic Gymnastics Championships, she won the ball event, and finished third in the clubs, hoop and ribbon events. At the 2019 British Rhythmic Gymnastics Championships, she came third in the all-around event. Frizelle won the all-around event at the 2021 Welsh Rhythmic Gymnastics Championships, and at the 2022 competition, she won the all-around, ball, ribbon, hoop and clubs events. That year, she also finished second in the British Rhythmic Gymnastics Championships hoop event, and third in the ball event.

Frizelle competed at the 2022 Commonwealth Games after recovering from a back injury. She won the individual hoop event, and her winning routine was performed to "Nessun dorma", which is her mother's favourite song. She was the first Welsh women to win the event at a Commonwealth Games. At the Games, Frizelle also finished eighth in the ball event, 13th in the individual all-around event, and was part of the Welsh team that came sixth in the team all-around competition.

Personal life
Frizelle was born in Cardiff, Wales. She studied at Cardiff Metropolitan University, where she obtained an undergraduate degree in sports science, and a master's degree in psychology.

References

External links

1998 births
Living people
British rhythmic gymnasts
Sportspeople from Cardiff
20th-century Welsh women
21st-century Welsh women
Gymnasts at the 2018 Commonwealth Games
Gymnasts at the 2022 Commonwealth Games
Commonwealth Games gold medallists for Wales
Commonwealth Games medallists in gymnastics
Sportspeople from Llanelli
Alumni of Cardiff Metropolitan University
Medallists at the 2022 Commonwealth Games